The Shanghai Municipal People's Congress (SMPC) is the Shanghai's local legislature within the PRC. With 855 members in 2020, SMPC is the elected council of Shanghai that oversees the Shanghai Government. The SMPC is elected for a term of five years.

Membership and election

Chairmen 
 Yan Youmin (严佑民): 1979－1981
 Hu Lijiao (胡立教): 1981－1988
 Ye Gongqi (叶公琦): 1988－1998
 Chen Tiedi (陈铁迪): 1998－2003
 Gong Xueping (龚学平): 2003－2008
 Liu Yungeng (刘云耕) : 2008－2013
 Yin Yicui (殷一璀): 2013－2020
 Jiang Zhuoqing (蒋卓庆): 2020－present

See also

 Politics of Shanghai

References

Politics of Shanghai
Government agencies established in 1954